Desmia discrepans is a moth in the family Crambidae. It was described by Arthur Gardiner Butler in 1887. It is found in Papua New Guinea and on the Solomon Islands. It is also found in Australia, where it has been recorded from Queensland.

Adults are black with large white patches on the wings.

Subspecies
Desmia discrepans discrepans (Solomon Islands)
Desmia discrepans dissimulalis Rothschild, 1915 (Papua New Guinea)

References

Moths described in 1887
Desmia
Moths of New Guinea
Moths of Oceania